Prize indemnity insurance is indemnification insurance for a promotion in which the participants are offered the chance to win prizes.  Instead of keeping cash reserves to cover large prizes, the promoter pays a premium to an insurance company, which then reimburses the insured should a prize be given away.

Hole-in-one insurance 

One of the earliest and most common forms of prize indemnity insurance is hole-in-one insurance.  Hole-in-one insurance, often purchased by a golf tournament host or sponsor, reimburses tournament organizers for the cost of awarding a hole-in-one prize in the event a tournament participant successfully hits a hole-in-one during the tournament.

According to the newspaper USA Today, the odds of an amateur golfer hitting a hole in one on an arbitrary par 3 hole are about 1 in 12,500.  These low odds allow golf tournaments to offer expensive prizes to golfers able to hit a hole-in-one during tournament play. In order to be able to afford such expensive prizes, tournament hosts can purchase prize indemnity coverage to protect themselves from having to pay for the prize from their own funds.

Companies that provide hole-in-one insurance may provide signs or other accessories to help the tournament host promote the hole-in-one prize. The insurance contract between the golf tournament and insurance company will detail rules such as: which holes on the course the prize will be insured on, how to verify the hole-in-one was achieved legitimately, and what to do if a contestant hits a hole-in-one on a hole other than the insured hole.  Variables that affect the cost of the hole-in-one insurance include:  the number of participants in the tournament, the skill of the participants (amateur vs. professional golfers), the length of the insured hole, and the value of the prize being offered.

Motor racing 

Prize indemnity is also used in motor sport to help offset the high costs of running a team. The highest recorded payout for such a policy was $250,000 during the 1992 Interserie.

Other uses 

In addition to hole-in-one insurance for golf events, prize indemnity insurance companies typically offer coverages for other types of contests as well. For example, contest coverage can frequently be purchased for contests such as half-court shots in basketball, field-goal kicks in football, home runs in baseball, blue-line goals in hockey, and even retail and casino-based promotions as well. 

For example, in the 2005 Super Bowl, prizes were set to be awarded for several events, including a return of the opening kickoff for a touchdown, a safety, and a fourth-quarter field goal of 50 yards or more.  Prize indemnity insurance was purchased to cover all these events.  However, none of the events occurred in the game.

Most television game shows pay for prize indemnity insurance for million-dollar prizes. One example came from April 2008, when such an insurance provider demanded RTL Group and CBS toughen million dollar win provisions after The Price Is Right $1,000,000 Spectacular produced three millionaires in the six episodes produced that season under the new rules imposed for the season. To win the $1,000,000 prize, the contestants had to give a winning bid within $1,000 of the final showcase's retail price. The insurance company demanded that this threshold be reduced to $500, and that one of the million-dollar pricing games be removed. After the four episodes aired with the new rules, RTL and CBS have not produced any further "million dollar" episodes in years since, possibly due to the insurance concerns. Since 2013, "Big Money Week" with $100,000 or greater prizes has aired in daytime close to the television sweeps and prime-time episodes have aired sporadically since then, but using the daytime budget. The most common Big Money Week million-dollar game is Plinko, by simply replacing the $10,000 slot with a $200,000 slot.

References 

Types of insurance